Belá is a village and municipality in Žilina District in the Žilina Region of northern Slovakia.

Genealogical resources

The records for genealogical research are available at the state archive "Statny Archiv in Bytca, Slovakia"

 Roman Catholic church records (births/marriages/deaths): 1686-1899 (parish A)

See also
 List of municipalities and towns in Slovakia

External links
Wayback Machine
Surnames of living people in Bela

Villages and municipalities in Žilina District